The Shiv Mandir, Hyderabad or Shiv Shanker Mahadev temple or  Goswamiparshotam Gir Chela Goswami Nihal Gir temple is a Hindu temple located in the Tando Wali Muhammad area in the Hyderabad District in the Sindh province of Pakistan. It is a century old temple.

History

The temple was built in 1895. Later it was rebuilt in 1945. After the formation of Pakistan the temple had not been operational for a long time and its surrounding areas were encroached. In 2021, the temple was renovated.

See also
 Hinglaj Mata mandir
 Ramapir Temple, Tando Allahyar
Churrio Jabal Durga Mata Temple

Reference

Hindu temples in Pakistan
Hindu temples in Sindh
Hyderabad District, Pakistan